The Eastern League has operated primarily in the Northeastern United States since 1923.  It was known as the New York–Pennsylvania League from 1923 to 1937 and the Double-A Northeast in 2021.  Over that -season span, its teams relocated, changed names, transferred to different leagues, or ceased operations altogether. This list documents teams which played in the league.

Teams

Map

See also

List of Southern League teams
List of Texas League teams
List of Eastern League stadiums

References

External links

 
Eastern League teams
Eastern League